Arturo de la Garza González (1 August 1936 – 28 January 2011) was a Mexican politician and businessman from the Institutional Revolutionary Party. From 1970 to 1973 he served as Deputy of the XLVIII Legislature of the Mexican Congress representing Nuevo León. He also served as member of the Congress of Nuevo León from 1961 to 1964.

On 28 January 2011 he was kidnapped by unknown men being found murdered some hours later in China, Nuevo León.

References

1936 births
2011 deaths
Politicians from Monterrey
Mexican businesspeople
Autonomous University of Nuevo León alumni
Members of the Congress of Nuevo León
Institutional Revolutionary Party politicians
Assassinated Mexican politicians
Members of the Chamber of Deputies (Mexico) for Nuevo León